Dr Mary Prowse Gell MB, ChB (16 April 1894 – 1978) was a medical missionary and co-founder of War on Want. She worked at St. Agatha's Hospital, Ping-Yin, Shandong, East China, and later became an associate professor at the  University Hospital, Tsinan 's Department of Obstetrics and Gynaecology.  After World War II, she settled in London and became Secretary to the Medical Missions Department of the Society for the Propagation of the Gospel.

Education 
Gell graduated from the University of Sheffield, M.B.Ch.B., in 1922.

References

1894 births
1978 deaths
Alumni of the University of Sheffield
Manx Anglican missionaries
Anglican missionaries in China
British expatriates in China
Christian medical missionaries
Female Christian missionaries